Nelson Strait is a channel in the Chilean Archipelago. It is located in Magallanes y Antártica Chilena Region of Chilean Patagonia.

 
The strait widens to the east into a shallow rock-strewn basin which lead into various channels.
These are (clock-wise from the north) Esteban, (between the islands of Jorge Montt and Esperanza), Sarmiento (between Vancouver and Piazzi), Smyth (between Piazzi and North Rennell) and Uribe (between Rennell North and Vidal Gomez).

The Nelson Strait is unsuitable for general navigation.

See also
 Nelson Strait (South Shetland Islands)

External links
 United States Hydrographic Office, South America Pilot (1916)
  

Straits of Chile
Bodies of water of Magallanes Region